WD40 repeat-containing protein SMU1 is a protein that in humans is encoded by the SMU1 gene.

References

Further reading